The men's 3 metre springboard, also reported as springboard diving, was one of four diving events on the Diving at the 1980 Summer Olympics programme.

The competition was split into two phases:

Preliminary round (22 July)
Divers performed eleven dives. The eight divers with the highest scores advanced to the final.
Final (23 July)
Divers performed another set of eleven dives and the score here obtained was combined with half of the preliminary score to determine the final ranking.

Controversy 
As Aleksandr Portnov waited to do a 2 and 1/2 reverse somersault in the springboard final, cheers broke out in three adjoining swimming pool during the closing stages of Salnikov's world record breaking 1,500m swim. The diver delayed his start until the noise had subsided but, as he took his first steps along the board, even greater cheers broke out as Salnikov touched in under 15 minutes. Under the rules Portnov, having started, could not stop before take-off. On protest to the Swedish referee G.Olander he was allowed to repeat the dive and went ahead again of Mexico's Carlos Girón. Later protests by Mexico against the re-dive and by East Germany that their Falk Hoffmann wanted to re-dive after allegedly being disturbed by photographic flashlights were both turned down by FINA. FINA President Javier Ostas stated that the decision taken by the Swedish referee was the "correct one”. FINA assessed all the Olympic diving events and considers the judging to have been objective". Portnov remained the winner with Giron taking silver and Cagnotto of Italy bronze.

Results

References

Sources
 

Men
1980
Men's events at the 1980 Summer Olympics